The Shivnath Express (Gevra Road–Itwari–Bilaspur) is an Express train belonging to South East Central Railway zone that runs between  and  in India. It is currently being operated with 18239/18240 train numbers on a daily basis.

Service

The 18239/Shivnath Express has an average speed of 44 km/hr and covers 504 km in 11h 15m.

Route and halts 

The important halts of the train are:

Coach composition

The train has standard ICF rakes with a max speed of 110 kmph. The train consists of 19 coaches:

 1 First AC 
 2 AC II Tier
 2 AC III Tier
 7 Sleeper coaches
 5 General Unreserved
 2 Seating cum Luggage Rake

Traction

Rake sharing

The train shares its rake with 12855/12856 Bilaspur–Itwari Intercity SF Express and 58212 Bilaspur–Gevra Road Passenger.

See also 

 Gevra Road railway station

Bilaspur–Itwari Intercity SF Express

Notes

References

External links 

 18239/Shivnath Express
 18240/Shivnath Express

Transport in Nagpur
Named passenger trains of India
Rail transport in Chhattisgarh
Rail transport in Maharashtra
Railway services introduced in 2005
Transport in Korba, Chhattisgarh
Express trains in India